General Juan José Guzmán (July 1797, La Unión – 19 October 1847) was the first President of El Salvador from 14 April 1842 to 1 February 1844.

External links

Notes 

1797 births
1847 deaths
People from La Unión Department
Salvadoran people of Spanish descent
Presidents of El Salvador
19th-century Salvadoran people
Salvadoran military personnel